Target is a New Zealand consumer advice show. It was hosted by Carly Flynn and Brooke Howard-Smith. The show ran for 14 seasons and remained one of New Zealand's highest rated factual programs and had won one Qantas Media Award.

Former hosts included Leanne Malcolm, Ian Orchard, Greg Boyed and Janet Wilson.

Current features on the show

Hidden camera trials
This has been a major part of the show since the launch of Target in 1999. It is used to reveal Trades People and Shops misconduct and illegal behaviour including urinating in showers.

Retail trials
In these trials often young actors under the age of 18 are sent into a store to purchase an item restricted to persons aged 18 or over, such as cigarettes, pornographic material and alcohol. The actor is given an expired EFTPOS card or less change than required to purchase the item, so they do not purchase the items in question. This is largely done to prevent Target from being sued by retailers in relation to a prosecution stemming the hidden camera trial, and in alcohol trials also prevents the actor being liable for prosecution (under the Sale of Liquor Act 1989, a person under 18 who purchases alcohol is liable for a fine up to $2000.)

In 2009 Christchurch liquor trial, there was a record broken for the youngest ever actor used in the trial: 10 years old, and she was allowed to buy alcohol.

Hidden camera house trials
Target have their own Hidden Camera house which is located in a different area of New Zealand each season. The house has Hidden Cameras throughout and is used to send various tradesmen there to carry out work, the tradesmen being left in the home alone while the occupant of the house goes out. Jobs can range from repairing appliances in the home, to building, electrical or plumbing work. The test is not only to see the standard of the work carried out but also the actions of the worker, whether he/she wanders into rooms of the house he/she has no reason to be in and whether the worker acts in a professional manner.

In March 2011, The house that Target uses for filming in Tauranga was uncovered by an electrician who had been called to fit a power point in the bedroom.  The electrician started the job but quickly suspected something was out of the ordinary when he noticed a diary lying open next to where he was working, bikinis on the bed, and photographs of women.  He also found a hidden camera in a smoke alarm.  He left the job immediately and phoned his lawyer who advised him not to continue. This event has not aired yet.

In May 2012 a Hidden Camera trial was aired revealing a carpet cleaner performing an indecent act in the actor's home. Within minutes of the occupant leaving the house the tradesman was filmed sniffing various items of clothing in a laundry basket and later spraying perfume onto a pair of woman's underwear. He then turns on the household computer visiting a pornography website and begins masturbating into a pair of the actor's underwear. The tradesman performs this act at least twice during the segment. This particular episode focused around this one hidden camera trial with trials of other carpet cleaners not aired. Neither the company the carpet cleaner worked for was named nor was the tradesman. The matter was referred to the New Zealand Police and the tradesman was charged with burglary and wilfully accessing a computer. The tradesman was fired from his job and granted name suppression.

Restaurant trials
Some trials have involved an actor visiting a restaurant or other food service place and while dining there taking a sample of the food purchased. The sample is sent to a lab for analysis. Also the standard of the service is examined and any hygiene practices.

The 16 June 2009 edition of the consumer show featured a hidden camera segment assessing the hygiene standards of eight Auckland cafes, and claimed chicken from Cafe Cézanne contained high levels of faecal coliforms.

TV3 released a statement on behalf of production company Top Shelf Productions admitting food samples from the cafes were incorrectly coded and they were unable to confirm which one had produced the contaminated food.

Subsequently to this the owners of Cafe Cézanne has started legal proceedings against Top Shelf Productions.

Service/repair trials
These trials were more common in the earlier seasons. A fault is created in an appliance such as a TV set, Microwave, DVD player and the item is then taken to repair outlets. When the appliance is returned to the actor the presenters then check to see whether the appliance has actually been repaired and the standard of the repair, as well as the time taken to repair the appliance and the cost.

Other trials
The other trials have included taxis, LPG bottle fills, Children's visits to Santa (2006 Christmas Special) and standards of services such as public toilets.

Product check
Every week the Target test family test a chosen product. In this test about 5 brands of a particular product are tested by the family. The test is done by placing each brand on a colour-coded dish with the members of the family not known what brand they are testing. Food items are usually taken to a lab to run other tests on the product as well. The test family are used for most product checks however for some products a group of students or experts in a particular industry may be used. The test family changes every year and is typically a nuclear family with mostly teenage children. The first, and most well recognized Test Family were the Coombs, who were the Test Family for three years.

Shame on you
Introduced in the 2007 Series, Brooke follows up on personal stories by consumers that have been ripped off, poorly dealt with or misled about a certain product. Some stories are not hard luck stories but just stories that cover wider issues and interviewing experts or affected parties. The dodgy operator is named.

What's up with that?
An occasional feature on the show. What's up with that? looks at issues consumers may face. An example was one week a segment was covered on paying a fee for a cancelled appointment. Another example was retailers selling items marked as 'Not for Individual Sale' individually.

Past features on the show

Seconds Anyone
Part of the 2008 series, each week Jeanette looked at buying a particular item second hand. An expert told consumers what to look for, how much to expect to pay and which brands were the best to choose from.

Things That Hack You Off
This was a segment in the 2006 Series, this segment covered anything that most likely 'Hacked' the consumer off, from slow service or poor service to parking fines.

Know Your Rights
This was regular segment in all of the earlier seasons from 1999 to 2003. A role play was done with two actors who would get into a different situation each week and would then ask what their rights were in this situation, the screen would then cut to David Russell from the Consumers Institute where David would explain what the consumers rights were in this situation. The role play would continue and as various points were raised once again David would explain the consumers rights in the situation.

In the early seasons of Target, the show partnered with the Consumer's Institute, offering discounted Consumer magazine subscriptions.

Apologies
In June 2009 Target apologized to Ponsonby's Cafe Cézanne for airing a report Target was unable to verify that accused Cézanne of selling food contaminated with fecal coliform. In September 2009 Target apologized for incorrectly calling the Pakuranga Lotto shop the Lucky lotto shop.

References

Consumer protection television series
New Zealand television news shows
Three (TV channel) original programming
1999 New Zealand television series debuts
2012 New Zealand television series endings
1990s New Zealand television series
2000s New Zealand television series
2010s New Zealand television series
Television news program articles using incorrect naming style